Sherysyn Toko  (born 10 August 1997) is a Vanuatuan beach volleyball player. She combined with Miller Pata to represent Vanuatu in beach volleyball at the 2022 Commonwealth Games, winning a bronze medal.

Toko competed at the 2020 Beach Volleyball World Tour.

References 

1997 births
Living people
Vanuatuan female beach volleyball players
Commonwealth Games bronze medallists for Vanuatu
Beach volleyball players at the 2022 Commonwealth Games
Medallists at the 2022 Commonwealth Games